Pedro Alejandro Escovedo (born January 10, 1951) is an American rock musician, songwriter, and singer, who has been recording and touring since the late 1970s. His primary instrument is the guitar. He has played in various rock genres, including punk rock, roots rock and alternative country, and is most closely associated with the music scene in Austin, Texas but also San Francisco and New York. He comes from a family of musicians.

Biography
The son of a Mexican immigrant to Texas and a Texas native, Escovedo is from a family that includes several professional musicians, including his brothers (and percussionists) Coke Escovedo and Pete Escovedo, and Sheila E. (Pete's daughter and Alejandro's niece). Alejandro's brother Mario fronted the hard rock band the Dragons, and another brother, Javier, was in the punk rock band the Zeros.

Escovedo began performing in the first-wave punk rock group the Nuns, with Jennifer Miro and Jeff Olener, in San Francisco, California. After Escovedo's departure, the Nuns recorded an album for Posh Boy Records but had little commercial success.

Escovedo moved to New York in 1978 and joined the Judy Nylon band. Escovedo lived in the Chelsea Hotel.

In the 1980s Escovedo moved to Austin, Texas, where he adopted a roots rock/alternative country style in the band Rank and File (with Chip and Tony Kinman) and then started True Believers (with his brother Javier, Jon Dee Graham and the bass player Denny DeGorio).

Escovedo's first solo albums, Gravity and Thirteen Years, were released in 1992 and 1994, respectively.

In 1997, Escovedo collaborated with Ryan Adams and the band Whiskeytown in recording sessions for their album Strangers Almanac. He sings on "Excuse Me While I Break My Own Heart Tonight", "Dancing with the Women at the Bar", and "Not Home Anymore". As a salute to Escovedo, a cover of a True Believers song written by him is covered by Whiskeytown on the re-released Strangers Almanac (deluxe edition).

In 1998 No Depression magazine named him Artist of the Decade. Escovedo was also involved in a side project that represents his hard-rocking tastes. Buick MacKane released the album The Pawn Shop Years in 1997, hearkening back to his musical roots in the 1970s.

In 1999, Escovedo contributed to a tribute album to Skip Spence, a co-founder of Moby Grape, who was critically ill with cancer. The album, entitled More Oar: A Tribute to the Skip Spence Album (Birdman Records, 1999), was intended to raise funds to address Spence's medical bills. The title refers to Spence's only solo album, Oar (Columbia, 1969).  On More Oar, Escovedo contributes his version of Spence's "Diana". The critic Rob Brunner commented, "The best contributions come from artists who realize that Spence's work is as much about atmosphere as words and chords.  ...Alejandro Escovedo offers an appropriately bleary 'Diana', Spence's darkest song." More Oar was produced by Bill Bentley, a Warner Bros. Records executive and Austin-referenced music producer.

In 2003, after having lived with Hepatitis C for many years, Escovedo collapsed onstage in Arizona as a result of the disease. In his long road to recovery, friends and admirers around the country organized benefit shows to help him. This effort grew into the album Por Vida: A Tribute to the Songs of Alejandro Escovedo, a two-disc set whose proceeds benefit the Alejandro Escovedo Medical and Living Expense Fund.

In 2005, it became known that Escovedo's song "Castanets" was included on the iPod playlist of President George W. Bush. Upon learning this, Escovedo announced that he would not play the song again as long it was on Bush's iPod or until he was out of office. After two "Castanets"-free years, as Bush was nearing the end of his term, Escovedo lifted the moratorium and began performing the song again.

Boxing Mirror came out on May 2, 2006 and included many of the songs he had promoted with the Alejandro Escovedo String Quintet. Escovedo went on a short tour with the Quintet, which included a date at Carnegie Hall's Zankel Hall in early December 2006.

In April 2008, Escovedo changed managers, hiring managers Jon Landau and Barbara Carr.

Escovedo released Real Animal, produced by Tony Visconti, on June 24, 2008. All of the songs were co-written with Chuck Prophet.

In 2009, Escovedo was invited to contribute to a tribute album to the late Doug Sahm. He contributed his version of "Too Little Too Late" to Keep Your Soul: A Tribute to Doug Sahm (Vanguard Records).

In June 2010, Escovedo released Street Songs of Love, also produced by Visconti but released on a new label, featuring songs that were originally presented during "Sessions on South Congress" at the Continental Club in Austin, Texas with his band, The Sensitive Boys. After starting out writing about nothing in particular, the record “ended up being an album about different types of love, the pursuit of a feeling that is forever elusive, mysterious, and addictive,” said Escovedo. A New York Times "critic's choice" review of Street Songs of Love claimed that, "In another, less fragmented pop era, this would be the album of thoughtful but radio-ready love songs to finally get Mr. Escovedo the big national audience he deserves."Pareles, Jon (July 4, 2010). New York Times. Nationally syndicated radio shows such as Little Steven Van Zandt's Underground Garage gave prominent attention to Escovedo and his album, continuing to play the song "Silver Cloud" in particular well into the following year.

In 2014, Escovedo appeared in the movie and contributed to the soundtrack of the movie Veronica Mars, singing an acoustic version of "We Used to Be Friends". Also that year, he co-produced and co-hosted the SXSW Tribute to Lou Reed with Richard Barone.

In October 2016, Escovedo released the album Burn Something Beautiful, which had been recorded in April of that year in Portland, Oregon. In January 2017, Escovedo did a short tour supporting the album, backed by some of the members of The Minus Five Scott McCaughey, Peter Buck, Kurt Bloch and John Moen, all of whom had performed on the album sans Corin Tucker and Kelly Hogan who did not tour but recorded on the album. All songs on Burn Something Beautiful were written by Escovedo, McCaughey, and Buck.

Discography

Albums
 Gravity (1992)
 Thirteen Years (1993)
 The End/Losing Your Touch (Maxi, 1994)
 With These Hands (1996)
 More Miles Than Money: Live 1994-1996 (1998)
 Bourbonitis Blues (1999)
 A Man Under the Influence (2001)
 By the Hand of the Father (2002)
 Por Vida (2004)
 Room of Songs: Recorded live at the Cactus Cafe in Austin, TX on February 28 and March 1, 2005 (2005)
 The Boxing Mirror (2006)
 Real Animal (2008)
 Live Animal: Live EP (2009)
 Street Songs of Love  (2010)
 Big Station (2012)
 Burn Something Beautiful (2016)
 The Crossing (2018)
 La Cruzada : Record Store Day version Vinyl (2020) (Rerecording of 2018 album The Crossing sung in Spanish with all liner notes translated to Spanish)
 La Cruzada (2021) (Full release of CD and Vinyl)

Other contributions
 More Oar: A Tribute to the Skip Spence Album (Birdman, 1999)
Hear Music Volume 7: Waking (2002, Hear Music) – "Wave"
107.1 KGSR Radio Austin – Broadcasts Vol. 10 (2002) – "Ballad of the Sun & the Moon"
WYEP Live and Direct: Volume 4 – On Air Performances (2002) – "Rosalie"
Keep Your Soul: A Tribute to Doug Sahm (Vanguard, 2009)
Metro: The Official Bootleg Series, Volume 1 2010
Uncut Starman - A Tribute CD featuring various artists covering 18 songs of David Bowie  (Uncut Magazine, 2003) - "All The Young Dudes"
You Don't Know Me - Rediscovering Eddy Arnold (Plowboy Records, 2013)- "It's A Sin"

References

External links
Alejandro Escovedo's website
Posh Boy Records
5 Star review for The Boxing Mirror 
Alejandro Escovedo at NPR Music
Alejandro Escovedo on Live Music Archive

 

1951 births
20th-century American musicians
20th-century American singers
20th-century American male musicians
21st-century American musicians
21st-century American singers
21st-century American male musicians
Hispanic and Latino American musicians
Living people
Musicians from San Francisco
Musicians from Austin, Texas
Musicians from San Antonio
American musicians of Mexican descent
Singer-songwriters from Texas
American male singer-songwriters
American writers
American filmmakers
Singer-songwriters from California